Tabanus autumnalis, the large marsh horsefly, is a medium-sized species of biting horse-fly. It is somewhat scarce compared to T. bromius and T. bovinus. This species shows slightly more of a preference for coastal marsh than some of the other European Tabanus, sometime even found in saltmashes. Wing length is 13–16 mm and about 16–22 mm in body length.

References

Tabanidae
Diptera of Europe
Insects described in 1761
Taxa named by Carl Linnaeus